William Tucker (September 14, 1942 – November 26, 2015) was a professional American football player who played running back for five seasons for the San Francisco 49ers and the Chicago Bears. He died of a heart attack in 2015.

References

1942 births
2015 deaths
People from Union, South Carolina
Players of American football from South Carolina
American football running backs
Tennessee State Tigers football players
San Francisco 49ers players
Chicago Bears players